Gloria is a 1931 French-German drama film directed by Hans Behrendt and Yvan Noé and starring Brigitte Helm, André Luguet and Jean Gabin. A co-production between France and Germany, a separate German version Gloria was also made. Such multiple-language versions were common during the early years of sound before dubbing became more widespread.

Cast
 Brigitte Helm as Véra Latour
 André Luguet as Pierre Latour
 André Roanne as Bob Deschamps
 Jean Gabin as Robert Nourry
 Mady Berry as Thérèse
 Jean Boulant as Félix Latour
 Jean Dax as Le président du comité 
 André Saint-Germain as Le photographe

References

Bibliography 
 Harriss, Joseph. Jean Gabin: The Actor Who Was France. McFarland, 2018.

External links 
 

1931 films
1931 drama films
French drama films
German drama films
1930s French-language films
Films directed by Hans Behrendt
Films directed by Yvan Noé
Films of the Weimar Republic
Pathé films
1930s French films
1930s German films